The Elias and Lisi Aho Farmstead is a historic farmstead in Waasa Township, Minnesota, United States.  It was established by a Finnish immigrant family and includes five surviving buildings constructed with traditional Finnish log architecture from 1902 to 1907.  The farm was listed as a historic district on the National Register of Historic Places in 1990 for its state-level significance in the themes of agriculture, architecture, and European ethnic heritage.  The Aho Farmstead was nominated for reflecting the successful cultivation of northeastern Minnesota's cutover forests by Finnish American settlers and their use of traditional log architecture.

Description
The historic district consists of six contributing properties, all dating to between 1902 to 1907.  Five are log buildings: the house, the main barn, a smaller cattle barn, a riihi (grain-drying barn) later used as a stable, and a smoke sauna.  The sixth contributing property comprises the fields east of the farmstead, which were first cleared by the Aho family during the same timeframe.

See also
 National Register of Historic Places listings in St. Louis County, Minnesota

References

1902 establishments in Minnesota
Buildings and structures in St. Louis County, Minnesota
Farms on the National Register of Historic Places in Minnesota
Finnish-American culture in Minnesota
Finnish-American history
Historic districts on the National Register of Historic Places in Minnesota
Log buildings and structures on the National Register of Historic Places in Minnesota
National Register of Historic Places in St. Louis County, Minnesota